Archives and Museum Informatics is a journal published by Springer. Begun in 1987, as the Archival Informatics Newsletter, it assumed its present title with volume 3 in 1989. The first ten volumes were published by Archives & Museum Informatics which sold the title to Kluwer in 1997.

Overview
The journal provides an international focus for knowledge representation and information management issues with respect to cultural heritage. Papers include technical contributions to cultural informatics, covering theoretical aspects, case studies, etc. The journal's subject areas cover interdisciplinary aspects in the following areas: Humanities, Social sciences and Law, Computer science, Document preparation and Text processing, Library science, Arts, Data structures, Cryptography and Information theory, and Management of Computing and Information systems.

ISSN information 
  (print version)
  (online version)

See also 
 Archival informatics
 Museum informatics

References

External links 
 Volumes 1-10 freely available online from Archives & Museum Informatics

Archival science journals
Information science journals
Museology journals
Springer Science+Business Media academic journals
Museum informatics